Events in the year 1936 in Bolivia.

Incumbents
President: 
 until 17 May: José Luis Tejada Sorzano (PL)  
 17–22 May: Germán Busch 
 starting 22 May: David Toro

Events
15 March: United Socialist Party (PSU) is founded as a result of a split in the Nationalist Party.
17 May: Following a series of general strikes, the military under Germán Busch, supported by the United Socialist Party and trade unions, overthrows the government of José Luis Tejada Sorzano and installs David Toro and president.
1–16 August: Bolivia competes in the Summer Olympic Games for the first time at the 1936 Summer Olympics in Berlin, Germany.

Births

Deaths

References

 
1930s in Bolivia
Years of the 20th century in Bolivia
Bolivia
Bolivia